"Running Kind" is a song written and recorded by American country music artist Merle Haggard and The Strangers. It was released in January 1978 as the second and final single from the album, A Working Man Can't Get Nowhere Today. The song peaked at number 12 on the U.S. country singles chart and at number 10 on the Canadian country singles chart. The song was later covered by Radney Foster for the Haggard tribute album Mama's Hungry Eyes: A Tribute to Merle Haggard. Foster's version was released as a single in 1994 and peaked at number 64 on the U.S. country singles chart. Johnny Cash also covered the song with Tom Petty on the Unearthed box set.

Personnel
 Merle Haggard– vocals, guitar

The Strangers:
Roy Nichols – lead guitar
Norman Hamlet – steel guitar, dobro
 Tiny Moore – mandolin
 Ronnie Reno – guitar
 Mark Yeary – piano
 James Tittle – bass
Biff Adam – drums
Don Markham – saxophone

Chart performance

Merle Haggard

Radney Foster

References
 

1977 songs
1978 singles
1994 singles
Merle Haggard songs
Radney Foster songs
Songs written by Merle Haggard
Song recordings produced by Ken Nelson (American record producer)
Arista Records singles
Capitol Records singles